The Kosovo women's national under-16 basketball team is a national basketball team of Kosovo, administered by the Kosovo Basketball Federation.
It represents the country in women's international under-16 basketball competitions.

Championship participations
2016 FIBA U16 Women's European Championship Division C – 4th place
2017 FIBA U16 Women's European Championship Division C – 5th place
2018 FIBA U16 Women's European Championship Division B – 21st place
2019 FIBA U16 Women's European Championship Division B – 20th place

See also
Kosovo national basketball team
Kosovo women's national under-18 basketball team
Kosovo men's national under-16 basketball team

References

External links
Archived records of Kosovo team participations

Basketball in Kosovo
Women's national under-16 basketball teams
U